The 1983 Lynda Carter Maybelline Classic (also known as the Lynda Carter Classic) was a women's tennis tournament played on outdoor hard courts in Deerfield Beach, Florida in the United States that was part of the 1983 Virginia Slims World Championship Series. The tournament was held from November 7 through November 13, 1983. First-seeded Chris Evert-Lloyd won her fourth consecutive singles title at the event and earned $22,000 first-prize money.

Finals

Singles
 Chris Evert-Lloyd defeated  Bonnie Gadusek 6–0, 6–4
 It was Evert-Lloyd's 6th singles title of the year and the 126th of her career.

Doubles
 Bonnie Gadusek /  Wendy White-Prausa defeated  Pam Casale /  Mary-Lou Daniels 6–1, 3–6, 6–3
 It was Gadusek's 1st career title. It was White-Prausa's 1st career title.

Prize money

References

External links
 International Tennis Federation (ITF) tournament edition details

Lynda Carter Maybelline Classic
Maybelline Classic
Lynda Carter Maybelline Classic
Lynda Carter Maybelline Classic
Lynda Carter Maybelline Classic